Emiliana is a feminine name of Italian origin. It can refer to:

As a given name

 Emiliana of Trasilla and Emiliana, Catholic saints
 Emilíana Torrini (born 1977), Icelandic singer

As a surname

 Cesare Emiliani (1922–1995), Italian-American geologist and paleontologist

Biology
 Emiliania (coccolithophore), a genus of phytoplankton
Emiliania huxleyi, a member of that genus
Emiliania, former name of a genus of bivalves now called Emiliodonta
 Emiliana (planthopper), a genus of insects in subfamily Tropiduchinae
 Emiliana alexandri, an extinct hemipteran insect
 Macropygia emiliana, the Ruddy Cuckoo-dove, a bird

See also

 Emilian (disambiguation)
 Emily (disambiguation)